Kuanysh Karakulov (Qýanysh Qaraqulov; 20 June 1977) is a Kazakhstani professional footballer who played as a midfielder for FC Atyrau and FC Ordabasy.

Karakulov was assistant to FC Ordabasy manager Viktor Pasulko, and briefly replaced Pasulko as caretaker manager in 2014.

References

Living people
1977 births
Kazakhstani footballers
Association football midfielders
Kazakhstani football managers
FC Ordabasy managers